In mathematics, Milnor maps are named in honor of John Milnor, who introduced them to topology and algebraic geometry in his book Singular Points of Complex Hypersurfaces (Princeton University Press, 1968) and earlier lectures. The most studied Milnor maps are actually fibrations, and the phrase Milnor fibration is more commonly encountered in the mathematical literature. These were introduced to study isolated singularities by constructing numerical invariants related to the topology of a smooth deformation of the singular space.

Definition 
Let  be a non-constant polynomial function of  complex variables  where the vanishing locus of

is only at the origin, meaning the associated variety  is not smooth at the origin.
,
which is a locally trivial smooth fibration for sufficiently small . Originally this was proven as a theorem by Milnor, but was later taken as the definition of a Milnor fibration. Note this is a well defined map since
,
where  is the argument of a complex number.

Historical motivation 
One of the original motivations for studying such maps was in the study of knots constructed by taking an -ball around a singular point of a plane curve, which is isomorphic to a real 4-dimensional ball, and looking at the knot inside the boundary, which is a 1-manifold inside of a 3-sphere. Since this concept could be generalized to hypersurfaces with isolated singularities, Milnor introduced the subject and proved his theorem.

In algebraic geometry 
Another closed related notion in algebraic geometry is the Milnor fiber of an isolated hypersurface singularity. This has a similar setup, where a polynomial  with  having a singularity at the origin, but now the polynomial

is considered. Then, the algebraic Milnor fiber is taken as one of the polynomials .

Properties and Theorems

Parallelizability 
One of the basic structure theorems about Milnor fibers is they are parallelizable manifoldspg 75.

Homotopy type 
Milnor fibers are special because they have the homotopy type of a bouquet of spherespg 78. The number of these spheres is the Milnor number. In fact, the number of spheres can be computed using the formula

where the quotient ideal is the Jacobian ideal, defined by the partial derivatives . These spheres deformed to the algebraic Milnor fiber are the Vanishing cycles of the fibrationpg 83. Unfortunately, computing the eigenvalues of their monodromy is computationally challenging and requires advanced techniques such as b-functionspg 23.

Milnor's fibration theorem 
Milnor's Fibration Theorem states that, for every  such that the origin is a singular point of the hypersurface  (in particular, for every non-constant square-free polynomial  of two variables, the case of plane curves), then for  sufficiently small,

is a fibration. Each fiber is a non-compact differentiable manifold of real dimension . Note that the closure of each fiber is a compact manifold with boundary. This small piece of hypersurface is also called  a Milnor fiber.

Milnor maps at other radii are not always fibrations, but they still have many interesting properties.  For most (but not all) polynomials, the Milnor map at infinity (that is, at any sufficiently large radius) is again a fibration.

Examples 

See also 

 Vanishing cycle
 Mixed Hodge structure

References

Knot theory
Singularity theory